Paraburkholderia phenoliruptrix is a species of bacteria.

References

phenoliruptrix
Bacteria described in 2005